Umuwa is an Aboriginal community in  Anangu Pitjantjatjara Yankunytjatjara (APY lands) in South Australia, serving as an administrative centre for the six main communities on "The Lands" (the others being Amata, Pipalyatjara, Pukatja/Ernabella, Fregon/Kaltjiti, Indulkana and Mimili), as well as the outlying communities.

Geography

Based upon the climate records of the nearest weather station at Marla Police Station, Umuwa experiences a hot-desert climate (Köppen: BWh, Trewartha: BWhl), with very hot, relatively dry summers; mild to hot, dry springs and autumns; and mild, dry winters.
It experiences summer maximum temperatures of an average of 37.3 degrees Celsius in January and a winter maximum average temperature of 19.6 degrees Celsius in June. Overnight lows range from a mean minimum temperature of 22.0 degrees in January to 4.8 degrees in June. Annual rainfall averages 216.9 millimetres.

Population
Approximately 50-80 people live at Umuwa.

History

Umuwa was established in 1991 as the administrative and service centre for the APY Lands.

The Hon Robert Lawson MLC, a member of the South Australian Parliament Standing Committee on Aboriginal Lands, on 1 June 2004 in the South Australian Legislative Council referred to Umuwa as the "Canberra of the Lands".  It appears that Umuwa, by proportion of population, relatively recent history of establishment and tendency for administration to be centred there, is modelled on the Canberra style establishment of a capital for the Lands.

Facilities
There is a police station at Umuwa, though it has not been permanently manned.  a new, permanent policing complex is being built at Umuwa. It will accommodate officers with specialist response capabilities, as well provide a base for a mobile unit which will be deployed in Fregon/Kaljiti, Indulkana and Pipalyatjara. The service will work closely with child protection service agencies address child abuse and family violence issues.

Mail arrives in Umuwa once per week by air mail.  Supplies arrive by truck weekly.  Unlike larger APY settlements, Umuwa does not have a general store.

Based in Umuwa, Anangu Pitjantjatjara Services (AP Services), an incorporated body established in 1993, provides essential services such as roads and housing. Regional Anangu Services Aboriginal Corporation (RASAC) was established in early 2010 as an offshoot of AP Services, and is now the biggest employer of APY people, with headquarters in Alice Springs and seven community depots. It delivers services such as rental accommodation, aerodromes, building repairs and maintenance, civil works, community patrols, fuel supplies, homeland services and municipal services.

PY Media is also based in Umuwa, providing multimedia and radio transmission services.

Nganampa Health, a community-controlled health service, is based in Umuwa.

As with most APY settlements, Australian Broadcasting Corporation and Special Broadcasting Service television are available.

For State elections (i.e. to elect the Parliament of South Australia), a mobile polling booth is taken to Umuwa.

A permit is required for a member of the public to visit any community on the APY Lands, as they are freehold lands owned by the Aboriginal people.

Utilities 
Unlike other settlements that must rely on non-renewable energy, in September 2003 work was completed at Umuwa for a solar power station which was expected to save 140,000 litres of diesel and 510 tonnes of Greenhouse emissions each year. In 2004 the facility was described as a field of 10 solar concentrators, each fourteen metres in diameter and each generating 20 kilowatts of electricity. Its total generating capacity was 200 kilowatts and the facility was expected to have a life of 30 years. The solar concentrators were parabolic dishes designed and constructed by Solar Systems (which was acquired by Silex Systems circa 2010).

The farm was taken offline in 2005.

On 20 August 2008, the facility was reactivated after a substantial upgrade. The field of refurbished concentrators was now capable of generating 715 megawatt hours of electricity annually, more than double its previous capacity (335 megawatt hours).

As of 4 February 2011, the solar farm had reportedly not been working for more than a year. On 30 June 2011, the South Australian Government confirmed that the sun farm was "currently not operational" and that it would be "mothballed". In August 2020, the government proposed to save a million litres of diesel by installing three megawatts of solar photovoltaic panels and one megawatt of battery storage to deliver 4.4 gigawatt hours of electricity per year, about 40 percent of the total power required. This third solar power farm was under construction as of April 2021.

The central power house at Umuwa supplies a 33kV electricity distribution network across the Anangu Pitjantjatjara Yankunytjatjara lands.

References

External links

Towns in South Australia
Aboriginal communities in South Australia
Australian Aboriginal missions
Anangu Pitjantjatjara Yankunytjatjara